This list of botanical gardens and arboretums in West Virginia is intended to include all significant botanical gardens and arboretums in the U.S. state of West Virginia

See also
List of botanical gardens and arboretums in the United States

References 

 
Arboreta in West Virginia
botanical gardens and arboretums in West Virginia